Jozef Cíger-Hronský (original name Jozef Cíger; born 23 February 1896 in Zvolen, present-day Slovakia, died 13 July 1960 in Luján, Argentina) was a Slovak writer, teacher, publicist, later secretary and manager of the Matica slovenská.

Life

He was born in 1896 into a central Slovak family of carpenters in Zvolen. He attended schools in Zvolen (1902–07), Krupina (1907–10) and finished his education in a Hungarian teacher school in Levice (1910–14). After that, he was a teacher at various places, with the interruption of 1917–18, when he was sent to the Italian Front in the World War I. His first prose came out in the 1920s (novellas and short prose). Aside of being a teacher, he was an editor of the children's magazine called Slniečko (from 1928 until 1945). In 1933 he became a secretary of the Matica slovenská and later in 1940 a manager, where he stayed until 1945. However, he fell under the influence of the Slovak People's Party (ľudáci). From the fear of persecution after defeat of the First Slovak Republic, he emigrated to Austria, Italy and finally settled in Argentina, where he worked as a designer in a textile factory. There, he established the Matica slovenská Abroad (Zahraničná Matica slovenská) and was a chairman of the Slovak National Council abroad and an honorary chairman of the Association of Slovak Writers and Artists Abroad. He died in 1960 in Luján, Argentina. After the Velvet Revolution of 1989 his remains were repatriated to Czechoslovakia and later reburied at the National Cemetery in Martin in 1993.

Works
Hronský was writing as a realistic author, but under expressionist influence. (if possible, literal English translations are given)

Prose

Drama (comedies)
1926 - Firma Moor ("Moor Company")
1929 - Červený trojuholník ("A red triangle")
1929 - Návrat ("Comeback")

Children's literature

External links

 Jozef Cíger-Hronský at Osobnosti.sk 

1896 births
1960 deaths
People from Zvolen
Slovak writers
Slovak children's writers
Burials at National Cemetery in Martin
Slovak schoolteachers
Czechoslovak emigrants to Argentina